Eukaryotic translation initiation factor 4B is a protein that in humans is encoded by the EIF4B gene.

Interactions 

eIF4B has been shown to interact with and stimulate the activity of eIF4A and bind to the eIF3 complex through the eIF3A subunit. This interaction results in the recruitment of the eukaryotic small ribosomal subunit (40S) to the mRNA which will in turn set the stage for the later steps leading to elongation.

See also 
Eukaryotic translation
eIF4F

References

Further reading